The December 2010 North American blizzard was a major nor'easter and historic blizzard affecting the Contiguous United States and portions of Canada from December 22–29, 2010. From January 4–15, the system was known as Windstorm Benjamin in Europe. It was the first significant winter storm of the 2010–11 North American winter storm season and the fifth North American blizzard of 2010. The storm system affected the northeast megalopolis, which includes major cities such as Norfolk, Philadelphia, Newark, New York City, Hartford, Providence, and Boston.

The storm had many similarities to the North American blizzard of 2006. The storm also generated a rare meteorological phenomenon known as thundersnow in which thunder and lightning occur concurrently with the falling snow. Several synoptic factors contributed to the intensity of this blizzard. The storm was difficult to predict due to disagreements between models; it wasn't until about two days prior when the most models anticipated a major snowstorm. The National Weather Service's Hydrometeorological Prediction Center and many other private forecasters were skeptical of the storm impacting the Northeastern states until about 24 hours of the storm's arrival as well; although, some models depicted the storm delivering a full-blown blizzard to the New York City metropolitan area as early as a week in advance. The Hydrometeorological Prediction Center even issued a statement on Christmas Eve, 48 hours prior to the storm, that they suspected the American models of having model initialization errors; thus, they believed these errors may have forced the storm to be erroneously modeled to come up the Northeastern coast.

Meteorological history

On December 22, an extratropical storm moved ashore in California and weakened. On December 25, while situated in eastern New Mexico, two areas of low pressure interacted with another that dropped down from central Canada and an ample amount of Gulf stream energy; as a result, the storm carried a fairly large amount of moisture influx from the Pacific, Gulf of Mexico, and Atlantic Ocean. The core of the storm eventually moved southeast into the Gulf of Mexico then abruptly turned sharply northeastward into the Florida panhandle and state of Georgia as it merged with an upper-level low pressure system located near Virginia. As it became a stacked low pressure system, the storm system began a period of rapid intensification off the North Carolina coast while tracking along the coast of the Northeast and Newfoundland.

On December 29, the storm weakened and left the United States. During the next several days, the system moved eastward over the Atlantic Ocean. On January 2, the storm began to re-intensify, but the system continued to drift in the eastern North Atlantic for another two days. On January 4, the system was named Windstorm Benjamin by the Free University of Berlin, which names all Low and High-Pressure systems that affect Europe. Windstorm Benjamin continued to moved eastwards across the Atlantic, and the storm began to impact Western Europe on January 8. On January 9, Windstorm Benjamin crossed the British Isles and turned to the northeast. For the next couple of days, Windstorm Benjamin held its intensity as it continued moving northeastward, before weakening on January 11, due to land interaction with the northern coast of Norway. On January 12, Windstorm Benjamin began to move inland into Western Russia, while slowly weakening. On January 13, Benjamin accelerated eastward, while rapidly weakening. On January 15, Windstorm Benjamin was absorbed into the circulation of another approaching extratropical cyclone.

Synoptic conditions

Snowfall

Measurement was made difficult due to  snow drifts caused by the winds. Central Park's reported  of snow from the storm is the sixth-largest snowfall on record for that location.

Areas to the east of New York City received 10 to 20 inches while 20 to 30 inches of snow fell across New York City, Northeast and Central New Jersey and the Lower Hudson Valley. Areas receiving the most snow are between Kendall Park and Elizabeth and between Brick and Atlantic City in New Jersey. This was because multiple convective bands of heavy snow fed in off the ocean into the large stationary very heavy snow band (with occasional lightning) over the areas that received 20 to 30 inches. A secondary heavy snow/rain band formed across Eastern Massachusetts the night of December 26.

Washington, D.C. and Baltimore and their environs were largely spared this storm, receiving little accumulation despite large snowfall totals further east on the Delmarva Peninsula.

High winds
The Greater New York area had sustained winds of 30–45 MPH with gusts to over 60 MPH during the afternoon and night of December 26. High winds caused near zero visibilities and treacherous travel conditions in many areas. The strong easterly winds also piled up water along the eastern coast of Massachusetts, leading to major coastal flood damage.

Impact
Late on December 25, WPVI-TV announced that the National Weather Service had issued blizzard warnings for northern and parts of central New Jersey, New York City, Long Island and coastal southern New England. WABC-TV also offered information on the blizzard warning that was posted throughout the New York City region.

On December 26, several closures were announced on KYW-1060 (the all-news radio station in Philadelphia), including the Please Touch Museum and Independence National Historical Park. Philadelphia mayor Michael Nutter declared a snow emergency beginning at 2:00 p.m. local time.
The NFL game between the Minnesota Vikings and the Philadelphia Eagles at Lincoln Financial Field in Philadelphia, scheduled for Sunday, December 26, was postponed until Tuesday, December 28. Ironically, it was scheduled to be played Sunday afternoon, but flexed to the primetime slot, displacing the San Diego Chargers-Cincinnati Bengals game to the afternoon.

Delaware had declared a State of Emergency on Sunday evening.

Amtrak's Acela Express and regular Northeast Regional service was shut down completely between Boston and New York.

North Carolina
North Carolina was one of six US states where a state of emergency was declared due to the storm.

New York City
By the storm's end, weather stations in Central Park had recorded  of snow. A combination of heavy snow and strong winds led to massive transportation lockdowns across the city. Nearly all roads in the city (with the exception of major arteries) were left impassable for many days because of the amount of snow. Hundreds of buses were stuck in the snow. More than 400 passengers were stranded on the A train on the IND Rockaway Line for seven hours starting shortly before 1 a.m. One train did not open its doors when it stopped at the station. Dozens of LIRR trains were frozen onto the platforms. Hundreds of plows were on the road. NYC's major airports, Kennedy, Newark and LaGuardia were shut down until 6:00 p.m. Monday evening. The MTA ran on a limited schedule, even on Tuesday morning, with many above ground subway lines not functioning. By Wednesday, only the Sea Beach Line, Franklin Avenue Line, and Greenport Branch remained suspended. The subway resumed full service on Thursday, the LIRR Friday morning.

Residents of the city were complaining to Mayor Michael Bloomberg about the slowness of the snowplows attempting to reach their areas. By the late afternoon on Tuesday, snowplows had reached the minor streets in Brooklyn. Many residents of Staten Island, however, had yet to see one. Many plows became stuck in the snow that had accumulated on the streets and several could not get through as many residents had simply abandoned their cars in the middle of roads once it became too hazardous or impossible to move. These cars became stuck as the snow accumulated around them, creating roadblocks for the plows.  Both Mayor Bloomberg and the chief of the sanitation department were urging residents to stay indoors and not shovel snow back onto the streets that had already been plowed. State Senator Carl Kruger called the response a "Colossal Failure".

Multiple explanations have been proposed for the relatively slow response of the snow cleanup in the New York City metropolitan area. For example, the local media did not fully alert the general public until Christmas Day about the impending storm due to the complexity and lateness of the forecast models predicting the storm; thus, public awareness was delayed. Another possible cause was that Mayor Bloomberg had previously laid off 400 New York City Sanitation workers due to budget cuts; therefore, fewer plows were at work. In addition, some city workers who are responsible for managing the snow removal process had taken the day off from work during the storm due to the Christmas holiday. Also, a snow emergency was not declared, contributing to the number of abandoned cars on the streets.

On December 30, the New York Post reported that several sanitation workers confessed that cleanup was intentionally slowed down to protest the aforementioned budget cuts. On January 3, 2011, WCBS-TV reported that prosecutors had obtained a video of two sanitation trucks driving down 155th Street in Whitestone, Queens after the blizzard with their plows raised so as not to remove the snow. Allegations were also made that sanitation workers slept on the job, hung out at a doughnut shop for 11 straight hours while on the job, and drank beer for six or seven hours while on the job. Claims were also made that supervisors encouraged such work stoppages. However, a month later, The New York Times  reported that the allegations of a slowdown remained unsubstantiated and that Councilman Daniel Halloran, who had originally reported the confessions, had not named his sources.

A man who attempted suicide by jumping from a ninth-story window was saved when he landed on a huge pile of garbage that had accumulated during the blizzard.

Two casualties were reported as the result of emergency workers being unable to reach those in need: a newborn baby and an elderly woman.

New Jersey 

New Jersey declared a State of Emergency on Sunday, December 26. They were affected the hardest because of its high winds and snow. Over  of snow was estimated in some counties such as Union County. Interstate 78, Interstate 80, and Interstate 280 experienced congestion, closures, and accidents. New Jersey Transit suspended all bus service, North Jersey Coast Line service, and Hudson-Bergen Light Rail Service. River Line service had partial closures and the Newark Light Rail was delayed for 20–30 minutes. Many people in the state were stranded on roadways and only emergency vehicles were allowed on the roads.

The highest amount recorded was in Brick, New Jersey, where 36 inches of snow accumulated. The visibility was near . Edison got , Lyndhurst got  and Elizabeth had one of the highest totals of snow of any city affected by this storm,  of heavy snow. Blizzard Warnings were prompted for eastern New Jersey, while Winter Storm Warnings were issued in the western portion. Blowing and drifting snow was a big problem on December 26 and 27.

Newark Liberty International Airport in Newark had received  of snowfall in about three hours, an instance of very heavy snow in a short time. Snow drifts as high as seven feet were spotted in portions of eastern New Jersey. The NJ Transit was shut down on late December 26 due to blizzard conditions occurring in the area. Cape May was one of many southern New Jersey towns that were affected by snow bands containing four-inch per hour snowfall rates. When the storm was off the coast of New Jersey, bands of heavy snow formed one after another, increasing already-hefty snowfall amounts even further. There were reports of snow plows getting stuck in the snow late at night on December 26 and the early morning of the 27th. On the 26th, visibilities in some towns were less than 0.1 miles. This caused whiteout conditions in towns along the Raritan River and the Atlantic coastline.

Cape May had reported nearly 15 inches of snow after the storm had moved out to sea. The town had lesser snow amounts due to a break in the southern half of the snow bands pivoting toward New Jersey. The snow totals were only expected to reach 10 to 15 inches at the highest. Instead, the highest amount was in Brick, New Jersey where 36 inches fell, nearly 3 feet of snow fell. I-95 Northbound was mostly covered in layers of snow, which was dangerous for some drivers.

The higher snowfall amounts occurred in central and northern coastal areas of New Jersey. The blustery winds in New Jersey gusted as high as 65 mph. The fact of the high winds caused the blizzard warnings to be issued by the Mount Holly, New Jersey (Philadelphia, PA area) National Weather Service officials.

Snow fell so fast that traffic came to a complete halt. Motorists had to be rescued the following day as snow continued to pile up and trap them on interstates and local streets, which themselves became completely impassable. Citizens began calling into news stations asking for help and giving reports, while plows and other emergency personnel became stuck everywhere. Newark Mayor Cory Booker notably used Twitter to help stranded residents and assure citizens.

Connecticut
Heavy snow and winds of up to  caused a gas station roof to collapse in North Haven, and widespread tree damage and power outages throughout the state. Service on the Metro-North New Haven Line and its branches was suspended on Monday due to equipment and switch failures caused by the storm. The greatest snow totals were in the western part of the state, with Wilton receiving 18 inches of snow. North Canaan reported 16.1 inches, and 13.9 inches of snowfall was reported at Bradley International Airport.

The blizzard was nicknamed Winter Storm "Adrienne" by WFSB-TV Channel 3. The local CBS affiliate has unofficially named local winter storms since 1971.

Maine
Blizzard conditions arrived in Maine on December 27. On December 28, a ski lift at the Sugarloaf ski resort derailed, causing several skiers to receive injuries after falling to the ground, sending seven to the hospital.

Massachusetts

Atlantic Canada
In Atlantic Canada, the nor'easter was the fourth major winter storm to hit the area in four weeks. Blizzard conditions forced numerous road closures and resulted in the death of a minivan driver on December 27 near Fredericton, Prince Edward Island.

See also

 Pineapple Express
 January 2010 North American winter storms
 February 5–6, 2010 North American blizzard
 February 9–10, 2010 North American blizzard
 February 25–27, 2010 North American blizzard
 March 2010 nor'easter
 January 31 – February 2, 2011 North American blizzard
 North American blizzard of 2006
 December 2009 North American blizzard
 December 2014 North American storm complex
 January 2015 North American blizzard
 December 15–17, 2020 nor'easter

References

External links 

 Timelapse Video – Sped-up footage of the blizzard
 "The blizzard of 2010", The Boston Globe
 "December 26–27, 2010 Snowstorm", National Weather Service Eastern Region Headquarters
 "Neptune Digs Out", Asbury Park Press

2010-12
Blizzards in Canada
Nor'easters
2010 meteorology
2010 natural disasters in the United States
2010 disasters in Canada
Natural disasters in Maine
Natural disasters in Massachusetts
Natural disasters in New Jersey
2010 in California
2010 in Maine
2010 in Massachusetts
2010 in New Jersey
Articles containing video clips
December 2010 events in North America